Ramblers F.C. was an English association football club from London.  The club originally played on Hackney Downs and moved to a private ground in Walthamstow in 1876.

History
The club was founded in 1874 as a spin-off of the Pilgrims side.  Of the XI which started the first recorded Ramblers match, against Leyton F.C. in January 1875, 10 had played for Pilgrims in 1873-4, and, like the Pilgrims, the club limited playing membership to 60 members.  At a time when a player could be a member or player of more than one club simultaneously, many of the Ramblers players also continued to play for Pilgrims. 

The club entered the FA Cup for the first time in 1875-86, and were drawn to play Maidenhead away.  As Pilgrims had entered the Cup as well, players had to choose which of the two sides to represent; those who had chosen Pilgrims travelled to the tie by train with the Ramblers' select.  Most of the first-choice Ramblers players decided to play for Pilgrims, and replacement players were former pupils of the Forest School of nearby Walthamstow, as they had not yet formed an old boys' club.

In 1876-77, the dilemma of whom to represent became more acute, as Pilgrims and Ramblers were drawn together in the first round of the FA Cup.  Again the better players chose to play for Pilgrims, who won 4-1.  Normally, each side would nominate an umpire for the match, but the two sides were so closely linked that they agreed to ask Charles Alcock to be the sole umpire.

The same tie came out of the hat the following year, this time the Pilgrims winning in a replay at the Ramblers' new Walthamstow ground, near the Cock Tavern, and again Alcock acting as sole umpire.

The club entered the FA Cup a final time in 1878-79, losing to Romford in the first round.  There is no record of the club after the 1878-79 season, with some players reverting to the Pilgrims.

Colours

The club's colours were dark red shirts, dark blue shorts, and dark blue stockings.  For its final season, the club replaced the dark red with maroon.

References

Defunct football clubs in England
Defunct football clubs in London
Association football clubs disestablished in 1879
Association football clubs established in 1874